Crazy Star is a 2014 Indian Kannada language romantic thriller film directed, edited and composed by V. Ravichandran and produced by his home studio Eshwari Dreams. Besides himself in the lead, the other ensemble cast include Priyanka Upendra, Prakash Rai, Bhavana Rao, Raghu Ram, Naveen Krishna, Akul Balaji, Neethu, Ravishankar Gowda among others in the pivotal roles The film is the remake of 2011 Malayalam action-thriller movie Traffic, which has its narrative in a hyperlink format. The film opened on 14 February 2014, coinciding the Valentines day. The film received negative reviews at the box-office.

Cast

Soundtrack 
The music is composed by V. Ravichandran. Lyrics are written by himself and Hamsalekha.

References

External links 

 Film review
 Indiaglitz review

2014 films
Indian romantic thriller films
Hyperlink films
Indian road movies
2010s romantic thriller films
Kannada remakes of Malayalam films
2010s Kannada-language films
2010s road movies